The 1996 UEFA European Under-21 Championship, which spanned two years (1994–96), had 44 entrants.  After the quarter-finals stage, Spain were chosen as the hosts of the final stages, consisting of four matches in total. Italy U-21s won the competition for the third consecutive time.

Format 
No fewer than 13 newly independent nations competed for the first time – due mainly to the fall of Socialist rule in Europe in the early 1990s.

Russia, who competed in 1994 were joined by nine further former Soviet Union states: Armenia, Azerbaijan, Belarus, Estonia, Georgia, Latvia, Lithuania, Moldova and Ukraine.

The exclusion (for political reasons) of the team from Serbia and Montenegro, then known as the Federal Republic of Yugoslavia continued. Croatia, Slovenia and the Republic of Macedonia were three former states of Yugoslavia who did compete though.

Czechoslovakia became two separate nations – teams from the Czech Republic and Slovakia complete the list of new entrants.

The 44 national teams were divided into eight groups (four groups of 5 + four groups of 6). The group winners played off against each other on a two-legged home-and-away basis to determine the final four, one of whom would host the last four matches.  The top five nations qualify for the Atlanta '96 Olympics.

Qualification

List of qualified teams

1 Bold indicates champion for that year
2 As Czechoslovakia
3 As West Germany

Squads

Results

Quarter-finals

First leg

Second leg

Semi-finals

Third-place play-off

Final

Goalscorers

3 goals
 Raúl

2 goals
 Florian Maurice
 Robert Pires

1 goal

 Vladimír Šmicer
 Robert Vágner
 Patrick Moreau
 Christian Nerlinger
 Gábor Egressy
 Károly Szanyó
 Gábor Zavadszky
 Francesco Totti
 Christian Vieri
 Hugo Porfírio
 Dani
 Óscar
 Iván de la Peña
 Roberto Fresnedoso
 Christian Dailly
 Simon Donnelly
 Stephen Glass
 Jim Hamilton
 Scott Marshall

Own goal
 Emílio Peixe (playing against Italy)
 Iñigo Idiakez (playing against Italy)

Medal table and Olympic qualifiers 
 France, Italy and Spain qualify for Olympic Games finals.
 Best losing quarter-finalists Hungary and Portugal also qualify.
 Scotland do not compete in the Olympic Football Tournament (See Great Britain Olympic football team).

External links 
 Results Archive at uefa.com
 RSSSF Results Archive ''at rsssf.com

 
UEFA European Under-21 Championship
International association football competitions hosted by Spain
UEFA
UEFA
UEFA
May 1996 sports events in Europe
1990s in Barcelona
Football in Barcelona
1996 in youth association football
Sports competitions in Barcelona
1996 in Catalan sport